Holy Rood Cemetery is located at 2126 Wisconsin Avenue N.W. at the southern end of Glover Park, adjacent to Georgetown in Washington, D.C. It is at one of the highest elevations in the city and has memorable views. The cemetery contains approximately 7,000 burials, including as many as 1,000 free and enslaved African Americans. It may be the best-documented slave burial ground in the District of Columbia. 

European immigrants who built the C&O Canal and the City of Washington are also buried at Holy Rood, along with Civil War veterans and others. At the western edge of the cemetery is the grave of Joseph Nevitt, a veteran of the American Revolutionary War.

Originally called Trinity Church Upper Grave Yard, the burial ground was established by Holy Trinity Catholic Church in 1832. It was enlarged between 1850 and 1870, and renamed Holy Rood Cemetery. (Rood is an old English word for Cross.) The cemetery walls were torn down in 1901 and new ones erected, and many trees were removed to prevent roots from disturbing gravesites and fallen limbs from damaging monuments during storms. The cemetery was active from the mid-nineteenth century until the early twentieth century. The last cemetery lot was sold in 1915, and a few burials took place as late as the 1990s.

Holy Rood Cemetery is owned by Georgetown University. In the 1980s, the university explored the possibility of disinterring the bodies buried there so the land could be put to other uses, but was blocked by a legal action brought by the remaining holders of burial rights. Until recently, the condition of the cemetery reflected years of disuse and neglect. Headstones had toppled, there were weeds and invasive shrubs, and the roadway was in disrepair.

In 2018, Georgetown University and Holy Trinity Catholic Church announced plans to restore the historic cemetery and build the Holy Trinity Columbarium there. In November 2019, Holy Trinity completed the 645-niche columbarium at Holy Rood.  The columbarium consists of a restored brownstone crypt, containing 99 niches in the crypt interior, and a seven-panel granite columbarium wall, built in the carriage way opposite the crypt, containing 546 niches. The first entombment in the columbarium was on November 2, 2019.

Priority for purchasing niches at the columbarium is given to Holy Trinity parishioners, persons with ancestors buried at Holy Rood, and Georgetown University alumni, faculty and staff. Others are welcome to purchase niches as they are available. One does not have to be a Catholic for remains to be entombed at the Holy Trinity Columbarium.

The first phase of restoring Holy Rood Cemetery is being completed in 2020. It includes enhancements to the entrance, a new ornamental gate and fence, and extensive relandscaping. Hundreds of trees and shrubs have been planted, the roadway is being repaved, and fallen headstones are being reset.  A portion of the proceeds from columbarium niche sales helps fund a Perpetual Care Endowment that has been established to maintain and improve Holy Rood Cemetery.

See also 

 Jesuit Community Cemetery (Georgetown University)
 Holy Trinity Columbarium
 Mount Olivet Cemetery (Washington, D.C.)

References

1832 establishments in Washington, D.C.
Roman Catholic cemeteries in Washington, D.C.
Georgetown University buildings